The table below shows a list of every city in the UAE with a population of at least 10,000, listed in descending order. The capitals are shown in bold. The population numbers are of the cities, and not the emirates, often with the same name.

Largest cities

Other towns and settlements

Gallery

References

United Arab Emirates, List of cities in the
 
Cities